Volodymyr Serhiyovych Bilotserkovets (born 22 January 2000) is a professional Ukrainian football midfielder who plays for Metalurh Zaporizhzhia in the Ukrainian Second League.

Career 
Bilotserkovets is a product of the Metalist Kharkiv and Zorya Luhansk Youth Sportive Sportive Systems.

He played for Zorya Luhansk in the Ukrainian Premier League Reserves and in June 2020 Bilotserkovets was promoted to the senior squad team. He made his debut in the Ukrainian Premier League for Zorya Luhansk on 16 July 2020, played as a substituted second-half player in a losing away match against Dynamo Kyiv.

References

External links 
 
 

2000 births
Living people
Sportspeople from Kherson Oblast
Ukrainian footballers
FC Zorya Luhansk players
FC Inhulets Petrove players
FC Metalurh Zaporizhzhia players
Ukrainian Premier League players
Ukrainian Second League players
Association football midfielders